Bangladesh National Zoo, is a zoo located in the Mirpur section of Dhaka, the capital city of Bangladesh. The zoo contains many native and non-native animals and wild life, and hosts about three million visitors each year. On 5 February 2015, the name changed from Dhaka Zoo to Bangladesh National Zoo.

Established in 1974, the  Dhaka Zoo is the largest zoo in Bangladesh, and is operated by the Ministry of Fisheries and Livestock. The zoo attracts around 10,000 visitors every day with the number increasing during the weekends and holidays. The zoo is also known for its poor conditions for animals and the corruption of its officials.

The yearly budget of Dhaka Zoo is Tk 37.5 million, out of which Tk 25 million is spent on feeding the animals.

History
On 26 December 1950, the agricultural, cooperation and aid ministry officially declared to establish a zoo in Dhaka. Hence the zoo started that time near Dhaka high court with several spotted deer, monkey and elephant. The zoo later shifted to present Eid-gah maidan with more animals.
Later in 1961 a board was created to ensure proper management of the zoo. Later, after acquiring animals from internal and from foreign countries, the zoo inaugurated at its present location 23 June 1974.

Animals

The zoo is currently home to 2,150 animals from 134 species.

The zoo exhibits 58 species of mammals, including elephants, cheetahs, rhinos, zebras, waterbucks, otters, hyenas, deer, giraffes, impala, black bears, tapirs, hippos, lions, many species of monkeys, chimpanzees, baboons, and Bengal tigers.

The aviaries at the zoo house more than 1500 birds representing 91 species, including peacocks, rhea, African gray parrots, cassowary, owls, ostrich, emus, teals, finches, babblers, owls, vultures, and eagles. The two lakes at the zoo also host migratory water birds each winter.

Visitors can also see 13 species of reptiles including snakes and crocodiles, and 28 species of fish.

Activities

Elephant-back and horse-back rides are available at the zoo and fishing also.

Criticisms
After a number of animal deaths in 2009, the zoo curator and deputy curator were temporarily suspended and a committee was formed to investigate the deaths.   Zoo administration claimed that its main problem was the lack of veterinary doctors (it had only one doctor), and that it had already requested additional veterinary staff.

The zoo is noted by international agencies as corrupt, and when two black rhinoceros were sent from South Africa to Dhaka in 2013, conservation groups in South Africa expressed concerns over of appalling treatment of animals, calling it a "Hell hole."

Gallery

Notes

External links

Buildings and structures in Dhaka
Zoos in Bangladesh
Tourist attractions in Dhaka
Zoos established in 1974
1974 establishments in Bangladesh